Saku Puhakainen (born 14 January 1975) is a Finnish footballer who plays as a striker.

Since 2000 Puhakainen played for MyPa in the Finnish premier division, Veikkausliiga. His earlier clubs include FC Kuusysi and Turun Palloseura. He achieved the Veikkausliiga top scorer title in 2003. With MyPa he has won the Finnish Cup in 2004 and the Finnish championship in 2005. After being released from MYPA, he returned to Kultsu FC playing in third division.

Puhakainen played three times for Finland and scored twice under coach Richard Møller Nielsen in 1997.

References

External links
 

1975 births
Living people
Finnish footballers
Finland international footballers
Finnish expatriate footballers
Veikkausliiga players
Myllykosken Pallo −47 players
Turun Palloseura footballers
Expatriate men's footballers in Denmark
Association football forwards
People from Lappeenranta
Sportspeople from South Karelia